is a Japanese footballer currently playing as a midfielder for Cerezo Osaka.

Club career
Ishiwatari made his J1 League debut for Cerezo Osaka in a 4–0 loss to FC Tokyo.

Personal life
Ishiwatari was born in Kyoto to a Nigerian father and Japanese mother.

Career statistics

Club
.

Notes

References

External links

2005 births
Living people
Association football people from Kyoto Prefecture
Japanese people of Nigerian descent
Japanese footballers
Association football midfielders
J1 League players
Cerezo Osaka players